The election was held on 8 May 1970 with one third of the council up for election as well as a double vacancy in Mosborough. Since the previous election the Liberals had gained a seat from the Conservatives in a by-election in Heeley. This election seen a consolidation of Labour control, with a further six gains, helped by a more favourable national trend - especially so in the South Yorkshire region. For the first time since the mid-sixties, Labour won the most votes, which a "delighted" Alderman - and head of the Labour grouping - Sir Ron Ironmonger attributed to the youth;

"I said we expected to win four seats, with Gleadless as a possibility, but Heeley was a bonus. The national swing obviously helped, but the really hopeful sign was the greatly increased Labour vote. Our vote was well up in places, and it must be the first time for some years that the Labour vote has been bigger than the Conservatives. I have got to give the credit for this to the youngsters. This is the only new factor, and they are entitled to the credit."

Sir Ron went on to express confidence in both Labour's prospects for the next year's elections, remarking "As things are looking at the moment we could have an absolute landslide next year", and their ability to retain control of the council until the upcoming reorganisation in 1973. The re-elected Labour governance promised its attentions would be focused on two key aspects: the environment, in which a committee - or possibly sub-committee of the already existent Town Planning committee - would address environmental questions, and a deputation on the replacement of St. Catherine's school - an important issue during the campaign - would be organised as quickly as possible.

Meanwhile, the Conservatives, who had been hopeful of gaining several seats, seen their targets - Burngreave, Birley and Walkley - swing further away from their grasp. They also resounded to contest the Gleadless victor Colin Radcliffe's narrow win of six votes, headed by the Heeley agent Doreen Smith, claiming that unmarked ballot papers had been counted.

Election result

The result had the following consequences for the total number of seats on the Council after the elections:

Ward results

References

1970 English local elections
1970
1970s in Sheffield